Jessica Williams may refer to:

People:
Jessica Williams (actress) (born 1989), American actress, comedian, and correspondent
Jessica Williams (musician) (1948–2022), American jazz pianist and composer
Jessica Williams (singer), lead singer of 1980s disco funk group Arpeggio, produced by Simon Soussan

Characters:
Jessica Williams, a fictional character in the 1973 film Satan's School for Girls
Jessica Williams, a fictional character in Jericho, a 2006 TV series

See also
Jessie Williams (disambiguation)